The Evangelical Lutheran Church in Baden (Evangelisch-Lutherische Kirche in Baden) is a Lutheran denomination in Germany. It is a member of the Lutheran World Federation, which it joined in 1968. It is also a member of the Conference of European Churches. There are about 3,500 members in seven congregations.

External links 
 

Lutheran denominations
Lutheran World Federation members
Baden